David Daniels (born September 16, 1969) is a former American football wide receiver in the National Football League (NFL) who played for the Seattle Seahawks. He played college football for the Penn State Nittany Lions.

References

1969 births
Living people
American football wide receivers
Seattle Seahawks players
Penn State Nittany Lions football players
Sarasota High School alumni